Mohamed Nihan Nasir (born 16 April 1981) is a retired Maldivian international footballer. He was a member of FAM Referees' Committee.

Club career
Nihan was first spotted during his youth years at Malé English School. He spent almost all of his senior career at New Radiant but played a season for Club Eagles.

He spent most of his career, suffering with serious injuries and was forced to retire at the age of 26.

He once coached for Muli Zuvaanunge Jamiyya in Zone 5 Championship, in the year 2002.

International career
Nihan represented Maldives in FIFA World Cup qualification matches.

References

External links 

1981 births
Living people
Maldivian footballers
Maldives international footballers
New Radiant S.C. players

Association football forwards
Club Eagles players